Rick Littlefield (born July 27, 1952) is an American politician.

He was born to Jarvis and JoAnn Littlefield (née Bilbo), on July 27, 1952. A native of Vinita, Oklahoma, Littlefield attended Northeastern Oklahoma A&M College and the Oklahoma Police Academy. He was elected to the Oklahoma House of Representatives from district 5, and served from 1983 to 1991. He was a member of the Oklahoma Senate from 1993 to 2005, representing district 1. Littlefield was appointed interim Sheriff of Delaware County in November 2011, following the resignation of Jay Blackfox.

References

1952 births
Living people
Oklahoma sheriffs
Democratic Party members of the Oklahoma House of Representatives
Democratic Party Oklahoma state senators
Northeastern Oklahoma A&M College alumni
People from Vinita, Oklahoma
People from Delaware County, Oklahoma